Gilbert Shashoo Bayonne (born October 10, 1988) is a Haitian-American soccer player, who plays both the forward and midfield positions. Bayonne is the nephew of former Haitian national team great, Pierre Bayonne.

Career

Youth 
Bayonne grew up in Amityville, New York and attended St. John the Baptist Diocesan High School where he played varsity soccer for four years, garnering All-CHSAA honors. In addition, Bayonne also enjoyed success on his schools basketball team for three years, sitting out his senior season in preparation for his collegiate career.

Bayonne played club soccer for Alberston Academy which today is under U.S. Soccer Development Academy and the New York Red Bulls Academy.

College career 
Bayonne received a full athletic scholarship to the University of Bridgeport. Once there Bayonne came into his own, he was a 4-year starter and was named to All-East Coast Conference and NSCAA All-Region teams during his career.

Professional career 
In 2010, Bayonne successfully trialed with Polish League 1 club KSZO Ostrowiec Krzyski. Bayonne was unable to come to terms with the side. In Spring 2012 Bayonne was invited into trials with Bidvest Wits F.C. of South African PSL. The club invited Bayonne to their preseason tour. Bayonne instead opted to sign with Tanjong Pagar United FC of Singapore's S-League.

International 
Bayonne has long been involved with the Haiti national football team and has been called to training camp several times in the past with the under-23 team in preparation for the 2008 Beijing Summer Olympics.

References

American soccer players
1988 births
Living people
Sportspeople from Queens, New York
Soccer players from New York City
People from Amityville, New York
Expatriate footballers in Singapore
Tanjong Pagar United FC players
Singapore Premier League players
American people of Haitian descent
Association football forwards